Process is Hong Kong singer Candy Lo's 10th studio album.

Track listing 
空白 Hung1 Baak6 (Blank Space) - 3:47
圍牆 Wai4 Cheung4 (The Wall)- 4:51
默音 Mak6 Yam1 (Silent Sound) - 03:11
愛到不能 Oi3 Dou3 Bat1 Nang4 (Love to the Limit) - 3:59
千歲 Chin1 Seui3 (1,000 Years Old) - 3:18
沉默不是金 Chén Mò Bù Shì Jīn (Silence Isn't Golden) - 3:13
走慢點 Zǒu Màn Diǎn (Run Slowly) - 5:23

Candy Lo albums